The Romance of Runnibede is a 1928 Australian silent film based on an incident in a book by Steele Rudd. Unlike many Australian silent movies, a copy of it exists today.

Synopsis
Dorothy Winchester finishes four years of school and returns home to North Queensland where her father has a large station. She is kidnapped by a tribe of local aboriginals who believe she is the reincarnation of a queen. She is pursued by two men who love her: Tom Linton, a stockman on her father's property, and Sub-Inspector Dale, a mounted policeman. One of the men gives his life to save Dorothy.

Cast
Eva Novak as Dorothy Winchester
Gordon Collingridge as Tom Linton
Claude Sauders as Sub-Inspector Dale
Roland Conway as Arthur Winchester
Dunstan Webb as Goondai
Marion Marcus Clarke as Miss Frazer
Virginia Ainworth as Mrs Conley

Production

A company was formed to make the film, Phillips Films Productions Ltd, with capital of £100,000. The prime mover behind it was American businessman Frederick Phillips, who succeeded raising the money when the industry was excited about the success of For the Term of His Natural Life (1927). Investors in the company included Steele Rudd and William Reed, Eva Novak's husband.

Several people were imported from America, including the director, Scott Dunlap, and star, Eva Novak. Dunlap's arrival was delayed so initial work was directed by William Reed. He received advice from Wallace Worsley, an American director visiting Australia at the time.

The movie was shot on location at an aboriginal reserve near Murgon in Queensland and in a studio at Rushcutters Bay.

Reception
Phillips announced plans to map more films with Dunlap and gave evidence at the Royal Commission on the Moving Picture Industry in Australia that Australian industry did not require subsidy. The film was previewed in Sydney in September 1927, seen by members of the Royal Commission, and was acclaimed by the critic from the Sydney Morning Herald who said it "deserves unqualified praise".

However Romance proved to be a major disappointment at the box office and by May 1928 the company was in liquidation. Steele Rudd lost most of the money he invested and Eva Novak left Australia still owed £3,000 in salary.

The movie did obtain release in the UK in 1928.

References

External links

The Romance of Runnibede at National Film and Sound Archive
Full text of original novel at Project Gutenberg

1928 films
Australian drama films
Australian silent feature films
Australian black-and-white films
1928 drama films
Silent drama films